Loay may refer to:

 Loay, Bohol, a municipality in Bohol, Philippines
 Luay or Loay, an Arabic given name